The Zirid conquest of Málaga occurred in 1056 between the Zirid Taifa of Granada and the Hammudid Taifa of Málaga.

Badis Ibn Habus marched against the King of Málaga and defeated him in battle successfully annexing his Kingdom.  After this victory Badis Ibn Habus installed his brother Tamim as the governor of Málaga.

References 

11th century in Al-Andalus
1050s in Europe